The 2003 Akwa Ibom State gubernatorial election occurred on April 19, 2003. Incumbent Governor, PDP's Obong Victor Attah won election for a second term, defeating ANPP's Samson Ime Umanna and about three other candidates.

Obong Victor Attah won the PDP nomination in the primary election. He retained Chris Ekpenyong as his running mate.

Electoral system
The Governor of Akwa Ibom State is elected using the plurality voting system.

Results
A total of about five candidates registered with the Independent National Electoral Commission to contest in the election. Incumbent Governor, Obong Victor Attah won election for a second term, defeating about four other candidates.

The total number of registered voters in the state was 1,624,495. However, only 82.42% (i.e. 1,338,970) of registered voters participated in the exercise.

References 

Akwa Ibom State gubernatorial elections
Akwa Ibom State gubernatorial election
Akwa Ibom State gubernatorial election